Tony Gulotta (August 4, 1903 New Orleans, Louisiana – March 2, 1981 Los Angeles, California) was an American racecar driver active in the 1920s and 1930s.

He competed in American Championship Car Racing and finished eighth in the 1927 National Championship driving a Miller, finishing third in the 1927 Indianapolis 500. After that season primarily focused on the Indianapolis 500. In the 1928 Indianapolis 500 Gulotta was leading less than 18 laps from the finish when his fuel line clogged forcing him to stop for repairs. He ultimately finished tenth. In all, he made thirteen starts in the Indy 500 with a best finish of third in 1927, his second start.

Indianapolis 500 results

References

1903 births
1981 deaths
Gulotta,Tony
Sportspeople from New Orleans
Racing drivers from Louisiana